Agnetha Fältskog Vol. 2 is the second solo album by the Swedish pop singer and ABBA member Agnetha Fältskog. It was recorded and released in 1969 through Cupol Records.

Album information
"Zigenarvän" was the biggest hit, but its overly romantic lyrics about a young girl attending a Gypsy wedding and falling in love with the bride's brother became the source of controversy. Its release coincided with a heated debate about Gypsies in the Swedish media, and Fältskog was accused of deliberately trying to make money out of the situation by writing the song.

Other tracks entering the Svensktoppen chart were "Framför Svenska Sommaren" and "En Gång Fanns Bara Vi Två".

A large part of the songs on this album were written by Agnetha's fiancé at the time, West German record producer Dieter Zimmermann who tried to launch her career in German-speaking countries like West Germany, Switzerland and Austria. Fältskog released a total of eight singles in the German language between the years 1969 and 1972, but her success was fairly limited. Tracks originally recorded in German on this album include "Señor Gonzales", "Som en vind kom du till mej" (Wie der Wind) and "Det handlar om kärlek" (Concerto d'Amore).

The album has been re-issued both on CD and iTunes.
The Dutch label Royal Records re-released the album on CD for the very first time in 2000. Next to the 12 original tracks the release also featured three bonus tracks taken from the Swedish TV series Räkna de lyckliga stunderna blott.

Track listing

Singles

During the year of 1969, three singles were released off of Fältskog's second studio album. None of them charted on the official Swedish sales chart Kvällstoppen.

Svensktoppen
Two tracks from Agnetha Fältskog Vol. 2 appeared on the important Swedish radio chart Svensktoppen.

References
 booklet, Agnetha Fältskog: Agnetha Fältskog De Första Åren
 https://web.archive.org/web/20100210202925/http://www.agnetha.net/AGNETHA.html

1969 albums
Agnetha Fältskog albums
Swedish-language albums